Krongo may be,

the Krongo Nuba people
the Krongo language